This page shows the results of the cycling competition at the 1998 Central American and Caribbean Games, held on 8 to 17 August 1998 in Maracaibo, Venezuela. Track events were held at the UCI not approved José Pachencho Romero stadium, also velodrome.

Medal summary

Men's events

Women's events

Notes

References

 

1998 Central American and Caribbean Games
Central American and Caribbean Games
1998
1998 in cycle racing
1998 in track cycling